Shyamala or Syamala may refer to:

People

Surname
 Gogu Shyamala, Indian Telugu-language writer and women's activist 
 Pavala Syamala, Indian actress
 P. R. Shyamala (1931–1990), Indian Malayalam-language novelist and short story writer
 R. Shyamala, Indian politician from Tamil Nadu

Given name
 Shyamala Goli, Indian endurance swimmer
 Shyamala Gopalan (1938–2009), Indian-American cancer researcher and civil rights activist
 Shyamala Gopinath (born 1949), Indian bank executive
 Syamala Kumari, Indian temple painter
 Shyamala Pappu (1933–2016), Indian lawyer
 Shyamala Rajender, plaintiff in the 1973 lawsuit Rajender v. University of Minnesota

Other uses 
 Shyamala (film), a 1952 Indian Tamil-language film
 Shimla, Himachal Pradesh, India, a city that rejected a name-change to Shyamala in 2018

See also